Counter-Terrorism Group (CTG), also known as Lexoman Parastin (Kurdish for protection and information) is a government agency and the primary investigative arm belonging to the Kurdistan Regional Government in Iraqi Kurdistan, headquartered in Sulaymaniyah. The organization is now a governmental agency that was established by PUK's intelligence service (called Lexoman Parastin) under the name CTG was first established in 2002 by the Patriotic Union with support from the United States and the CIA and the MI6 and as a response to the growing influence and threat from Ansar al-Islam in the areas which was the former Islamic Emirate of Byara. The primary function of the agency is investigation of crimes relating to both the internal and external security of the Kurdistan region. The agency officially has power to arrest holds jurisdiction over a number of crimes in the region including terrorism. 

Counter Terrorism Group (CTG) collects intelligence and carries out operations to prevent terrorists in Iraq from destabilizing the Kurdistan region in cooperation with U.S. forces.

References

Resources

Official CTG KURDISTAN Website

Military of Iraq